For the Winter Olympics, there are 24 venues starting with the letter 'S'.

References